The Gates of Lodore is the scenic entrance to the Canyon of Lodore, a canyon on the Green River in northwestern Colorado, United States.  The name Gates of Lodore has become synonymous with the canyon itself and the two names are used interchangeably. The Canyon commences as the Green River departs Browns Park and cuts through the Uinta Mountains meandering eighteen miles until its end at Echo Park (Colorado), the confluence of the Green and Yampa River. It was named by the Powell Expedition after the English poem Cataract of Lodore. It is located in Dinosaur National Monument.

References

External links
 

Canyons and gorges of Colorado
Dinosaur National Monument
Green River (Colorado River tributary)
Landforms of Moffat County, Colorado